McAdorey is a surname. Notable people with the surname include:

Bob McAdorey (1935–2005), Canadian television and radio broadcaster
John McAdorey (1974–2019), Irish sprinter
Michelle McAdorey, Canadian singer-songwriter